Hua Hin Airport  is an international airport serving Hua Hin District in Prachuap Khiri Khan Province, Thailand.

Airport upgrade
In August 2018 the Department of Airports announced that it will spend 3.5 billion baht to upgrade Hua Hin Airport over the next five years. The number of travellers using the airport is expected to increase by tenfold, to three million a year, in that timeframe. The upgrade is part of the "Riviera Thailand" and Southern Economic Corridor projects. The work at the airport will take four to five years. It includes enlarging the existing passenger terminal, building a second one, expanding hangar space, and widening the runway from 35 to 45 metres.
The runways RESA are below ICAOs recommendation.

Airlines and destinations

In 2019, AirAsia flights to Hua Hin from Kuala Lumpur carried 44,613 passengers.

In 2021, due to the COVID-19 pandemic, Air Asia suspended their flights into and out of Hua Hin. In February 2022, when Thailand reopened for tourism, Air Asia restarted their Chiang Mai - Hua Hin flights. Initially these flights were on Tuesdays, Thursdays, and Saturdays. These flights are now on Sundays, Wednesdays, and Fridays.

References

External links

 
 

Airports in Thailand
Buildings and structures in Prachuap Khiri Khan province
Airports established in 1961